is a Japanese beach volleyball player.

Tokuno competed at the FIVB Beach Volleyball World Tour between 1997 and 2005. In 2004 she qualified to the Summer Olympics, in Athens, alongside your long-time partner Chiaki Kusuhara. They won only one of the three matches in the group stage and did not advance to the medal round.

References

External links
 
 
 

1974 births
Living people
Japanese beach volleyball players
Japanese women's volleyball players
Women's beach volleyball players
Olympic beach volleyball players of Japan
Asian Games medalists in beach volleyball
Asian Games bronze medalists for Japan
Medalists at the 1998 Asian Games
Medalists at the 2002 Asian Games
Beach volleyball players at the 1998 Asian Games
Beach volleyball players at the 2002 Asian Games
Beach volleyball players at the 2004 Summer Olympics
People from Matsuyama, Ehime